The following highways are numbered 449:

Canada
Manitoba Provincial Road 449

Japan
 Japan National Route 449

United States
  Kentucky Route 449
  Louisiana Highway 449
  Maryland Route 449
  Montana Secondary Highway 449
  Pennsylvania Route 449
  Puerto Rico Highway 449
  Tennessee State Route 449
  Farm to Market Road 449